ICIAM may refer to:

 International Council for Industrial and Applied Mathematics, an organisation for professional applied mathematics societies.
 International Congress on Industrial and Applied Mathematics, a four-yearly international meeting.